Aubigny is a commune in the Somme department in Hauts-de-France in northern France.

Demography

Places and monuments 
 Church Sainte-Colombe (1821). 
 British Cemetery

sport and leisure 

In Aubigny, teams are playing balle à la main which is a traditional sport in Picardy.

See also
Communes of the Somme department

References

Communes of Somme (department)